A bronze statue of Charles de Gaulle stands in Carlton Gardens in the City of Westminster, London. Charles de Gaulle, the leader of Free France, set up his government in exile at No. 4 Carlton Gardens.

The statue was campaigned for by Mary Soames, the daughter of De Gaulle's contemporary Winston Churchill. It was unveiled by Queen Elizabeth The Queen Mother on 23 June 1993 in the presence of Jacques Chirac, at that time Mayor of Paris, and the President of the National Assembly Philippe Séguin, as well as De Gaulle's chauffeur-translator Olivia Jordan. The architect was Bernard Wiehahn and the sculptor Angela Conner. De Gaulle is portrayed in the uniform of a brigadier-general. The statue is one of 39 in London maintained by English Heritage, the majority of which are in Westminster.

The French Embassy commemorates De Gaulle at the statue annually. The President of France, Emmanuel Macron, laid a wreath on his visit to London on 18 June 2020, the 80th anniversary of De Gaulle's resistance speech.

The enthusiastic fundraising for the statue by the British public led to calls for a statue of Churchill to be placed in the French capital, which was unveiled in 1998.

References

External links
 

1993 sculptures
Bronze sculptures in the City of Westminster
Outdoor sculptures in London
Statues in the City of Westminster
London
Statues of military officers
Statues of presidents